Chiffon (from the French word  which means "cloth or rag"; Arabic    transparent, diaphanous, translucent fabric, or gauze; (  s.th.) to shimmer through, reveal) is a lightweight, balanced plain-woven sheer fabric, or gauze, like gossamer, woven of alternate S- and Z-twist crepe (high-twist) yarns.  The twist in the crepe yarns puckers the fabric slightly in both directions after weaving, giving it some stretch and a slightly rough feel.

Characteristics 
Chiffon is a lightweight fabric which is associated with elegance and luxury; it drapes well and has a shimmery and sheer appearance. Under a magnifying glass, chiffon resembles a fine net or mesh, which gives it some transparency.

Chiffon can be produced out of natural and synthetic fibres. Silk chiffon was very expensive, and it is with the development of synthetic chiffon, such as nylon chiffon, polyester chiffon, and rayon chiffon, that chiffon became more accessible and more popular for common usage. 

Since chiffon is a light-weight fabric which frays easily, bound or French seams must be used to stop the fabric from fraying. These seams are characterized by s-twist and z-twist crepe yarns, that are spun in counter-clockwise and clockwise motions respectively.

Natural fibres 
Early chiffon was made purely from silk and was very expensive; when used in fashion, it was associated with high status. Silk chiffon displays colours beautifully since silk fibres absorb dyes well. Chiffon also drapes well, adding structure to the clothing item it is formed into.  Silk chiffon needs to be dry cleaned. 

Chiffon could also be made out of cotton.

Synthetic fibres 
In 1938, a nylon chiffon was invented; this was followed by the creation of polyester chiffon in 1958, which became immensely popular due to its resilience and low cost.  

Chiffon can also be produced out of rayon.

Usage 
Chiffon is most commonly used in evening wear, especially as an overlay, for giving an elegant and floating appearance to the gown. It is also a popular fabric used in blouses, ribbons, scarves and lingerie. 

In India, Chiffon is primarily used to make Sarees and dupattas.

Similar items 
Chiffon is smoother and more lustrous than the similar fabric georgette.

References

External links 
 

Spinning
Woven fabrics